Titstare is a fictional mobile application centred on pictures of men staring at women and their breasts. It was introduced at a 2013 hackathon at TechCrunch's TechCrunch Disrupt conference in San Francisco, California by Jethro Botts and David Boulton. Titstare became the subject of public controversy, described by some as symptomatic of sexist attitudes in Silicon Valley's startup culture, and others as brilliant satire. Conference organizers later apologized for the misogynistic presentation.

History

Background

TechCrunch, a technology news website, was established in 2005 and acquired by internet giant AOL in September 2010. The acquisition was seen by AOL as a move towards solidifying its position as a provider of technical content and was announced at the 2010 edition of the annual conference sponsored by TechCrunch, known as Disrupt.

Disrupt events, generally held early in the fall of each year, are conclaves which bring together representatives of startup companies, industry insiders, and interested others for presentations and networking, typically also including the opportunity for collaborative hackathon sessions. It was at Disrupt 2013, held in San Francisco, that Australian programmers Jethro Batts and David Bolton debuted their new tongue-in-cheek mobile phone app, Titstare, described by the pair as "an app where you take photos of yourself staring at tits".

On Sunday, September 8, the duo delivered their rehearsed one-minute-long presentation – a series of mild breast-related jokes and puns – tying in with their humorously intended product. This generated a mixed response from the assembled crowd, running the gamut from indignation to uncomfortable laughter to genuine appreciation of the "twisted kind of standup" intended by the presenters.

Reaction

While some considered the product and the presentation to be humorous satire, Titstare was accused of adding to the institutionalized sexism, known as brogrammer culture, in the American tech industry. Response was immediate and primarily negative; journalist Abby Ohlheiser wrote that the app's intent, the agglomeration of photos of men staring at partially clothed female cleavage, effectively trivialized the right of women to consent. After he defended the app against allegations of misogyny on Twitter, Business Insider Chief technology officer Pax Dickinson was forced to resign. Dickinson later wrote an apology, which was published on VentureBeat.

Much of the criticism appeared on Twitter, with one representative tweet stating, "There goes my attempt to teach my 9 [year old] girl how welcoming tech industry is to women."

Apologies

TechCrunch was immediate in issuing a public apology for the Titstare presentation, as well as one for an offensive masturbation app presented later in the day, deeming the presentations "misogynistic" and declaring:

Sexism is a major problem in the tech industry, and we’ve worked hard to counteract it in our coverage and in our own hiring. Today’s issues resulted from a failure to properly screen our hackathons for inappropriate content ahead of time and establish clear guidelines for these submissions. Trust us, that changed as soon as we saw what happened at our show. Every presentation is getting a thorough screening from this hackathon onward. Any type of sexism or other discriminatory and/or derogatory speech will not be allowed.... We are sorry.

The creators themselves took to Twitter with a speedy apology, stating "sorry if we offended some of you, very unintentional. Just a fun Aussie hack."

Commenting on the affair in The Guardian, journalist Amy Gray faulted conference organizers, whom she presumed knew about the content of presentations beforehand based upon mandatory pre-convention uploads of personal and project information. Gray felt the Titstare affair emblematic of a duality in the tech world, which was on the one hand perfectly meritocratic in theory, while in practice being an industry which "runs on privilege, with sexist and juvenile behaviour based on gender stereotypes being routinely displayed".  Alexia Tsotsis said that the presenters did not list the name of their app.

Footnotes

Internet properties established in 2013
Android (operating system) software